Servet Coşkun (born 28 October 1990) is a Turkish freestyle wrestler.

Career 
Servet Coşkun competed at the 65 kg division in the 2014 European Wrestling Championships and won the silver medal after losing to Magomed Kurbanaliev of Russia.

He competed in the 70kg event at the 2022 World Wrestling Championships held in Belgrade, Serbia.

References

External links
 

1990 births
Living people
Turkish male sport wrestlers
European Wrestling Championships medalists
21st-century Turkish people